Mictocommosis argus is a species of moth of the  family Tortricidae. It is found in Cameroon, Republic of Congo, Democratic Republic of Congo, Equatorial Guinea and Gabon.

References

Moths described in 1897
Mictocommosis
Moths of Africa